Notting Hill and Ealing High School is an independent school for girls aged 4 – 18 in Ealing, London. Founded in 1873, it is one of the 26 schools that make up the Girls' Day School Trust.  It has a Junior Department of 310 girls (ages 4–11) and a Senior Department of 600 girls (ages 11–18). The current Headmaster is Mr Matthew Shoults. Ms Bevan is Head of the Junior School.

History 
Since being founded in 1873, the school has changed both its location and its name.  When the Girls' Day School Trust, then the Girls' Public Day School Trust, was formed in 1872, it established its first two schools in West London. In January 1873, the Trust opened Chelsea High School (a predecessor of Kensington Preparatory School) to serve the area immediately to the west of the centre of the city and nine months later, Notting Hill High School which was to serve families in the area to the north of Hyde Park. Harriet Morant Jones was the founding head who looked after ten pupils assisted by her sister. Harriet Jones retired in 1900 and controversially Ethel Gavin was appointed instead of an internal heir apparent and resignations followed. Gavin became an "capable and experienced headmistress" until 1908 when she moved to the GPDST school at Wimbledon.

The school originally occupied premises in Norland Square but eventually outgrew these and moved to Ealing in 1931 and became known as Notting Hill and Ealing High School for Girls. Following the Education Act 1944 it became a direct grant grammar school in 1946. When the direct grant scheme was abolished in 1976, it became an independent school.

Facilities 
Extensive remodelling over the years has enabled the School to incorporate a number of facilities. The School has retained its period facade and a glass extension, the West Wing, was added in 2003 with a 25 metre indoor pool, a spacious library, an assembly hall, music recital hall, recording studio, music practice rooms, new classroom space, three art studios and a 10 metre high sports hall with trampolines.

In 2006 new classrooms, a new design and art room as well as a science lab were added to the facilities in the Junior School. A new Sixth Form Centre with its own gym opened in 2010 and the following year a dining room which is used by all girls and staff.

Further additions in 2013 included a hall for assemblies, whole-school gatherings, plays and events, 4-court sports hall built to Sport England standards, 100-seat studio theatre with lighting and sound, a drama workshop area, dance studio with a separate area for rowing machines and all-weather courts and pitch were opened.

Present day 
The school numbers 910 girls in 2018/19. Entry to the school is by assessment normally at ages 4+, 7+, 11+ or 16+. The school has a strong academic tradition. In 2018, 91.65% of grades at GCSE were A*/A and 98.84% were A*-B. At A Level 65% of grades were A*/A and 94% were A*-B.

In the 2019 Times School League Tables, NHEHS featured in the Top 20 for both GCSE and A-Levels and is one of only 10 schools in the country to achieve this accolade.

In 2017 the Junior School was awarded "Independent Prep School of the Year" by the Sunday Times' Parent Power Guide, observing that the school "proves you can have both outstanding academic success and a relaxed, happy school where girls are encouraged to be individuals and to express themselves".

And in their last report, the ISI inspectors reported, "pupils' achievement in curricular and extra-curricular activities and their learning is exceptional as is their attainment in national tests at age 11 and at A Level".

Former pupils keep in touch with each other through the Old Girls' Association.

School fees
In 2018/19 fees are £4,771 per term (Junior School) and £6,187 per term (Senior School). Academic and Music Scholarships are awarded at 11+ and 16+ and there are further scholarships at 16+.

Notable former pupils

Achieng Ajulu-Bushell (b. 1994), Kenyan and British swimmer
Margaret Alexander, Countess Alexander of Tunis  (1905–1977),  Viceregal consort of Canada, Châtelaine of Rideau Hall &  Deputy Lord Lieutenant of Berkshire
 Professor Polly Arnold (b. 1972)  Professor of Chemistry at the University of Edinburgh
Ava Alice Muriel Astor (1902-1956), American heiress and socialite
Barbara Ayrton-Gould (1886–1950), Labour politician and suffragist
Sarah Badel (b. 1943), actress
Angellica Bell (b. 1976), television presenter
Frances Blogg (1869–1938), author and poet
Mabel Haynes Bode (1864–1922), academic
Dame Harriette Chick  (1875–1977), protein scientist and nutritionist
Diana Churchill (1909–1963), daughter of Sir Winston Churchill
Sarah Churchill, Baroness Audley (1914–1982), actress
Mary Collin (1860–1955), suffragist
Agnes de Selincourt (1872–1917), missionary and educator
Astra Desmond  (1893–1973), contralto
Frances Hermia Durham  (1873–1948), civil servant
Kathleen Mary Easmon Simango (1892-1924), Sierra Leonean missionary and artist
Professor Beatrice Edgell (1871–1948), psychologist
Katharine Esdaile (1881–1950), art historian 
Pippa Evans (b. 1982), comedian
Margaret Fairweather (1901–1944), aviator
Kathryn Flett (b. 1964), TV critic
Alice Franklin  (1885–1964), feminist
Lynne Frederick (1954–1994), actress
Abi Fry (b. 1981), violist with the band British Sea Power
Jamila Gavin  (b. 1941), author
Rose Graham  (1875–1963), historian
Virginia Graham (1910–1993), writer, poet and translator
Olivia Hallinan (b. 1985), actress
Emily Hamilton (b. 1971), actress
Bettany Hughes  (b. 1968), historian
Violet Hunt (1862-1942), author and literary hostess
Konnie Huq (b. 1975), television presenter
Rupa Huq (b. 1972), Labour Party Member of Parliament
Aeta Lamb (1886–1928), suffragist
Karolina Laskowska (b. 1992), fashion designer
Nona Liddell  (1927–2017), violinist
Rebecca Lowe (b. 1980), sports broadcaster
Margaret Mackworth, 2nd Viscountess Rhondda (1883–1958), suffragist
Betty Miller (1910-1965), author
Ernestine Mills (1871–1959), artist, writer & suffragist
Jane Alice Morris (1861–1935), embroiderer
May Morris (1862–1938), artist & editor
Irene Petrie (1864–1897), missionary
Rosalind Pitt-Rivers  (1907–1990), biochemist
Ruth Plant  (1912–1988) architect & academic
Eleanor Purdie (1872–1929), philologist
Clara Rackham (1875–1966), suffragist
Hannah Reid (b. 1989), musician with the band London Grammar
Dame Angela Rumbold  (1932–2010), Member of Parliament & Government Minister
Hilda Runciman, Viscountess Runciman of Doxford (1869–1956), Liberal politician
Dame Nancy Salmon  (1906–1999), Women's Royal Air Force leader
Dame Louise Samuel  (1870–1925), suffragist & charity worker
Professor Caroline Skeel (1872–1951), historian
GB Stern (1890–1973), novelist
Hannah Sullivan (b. 1979), poet
Helena Swanwick  (1864–1939), suffragist & pacifist
Penny Vincenzi (1939–2018), novelist
Nina Wadia (b. 1968), actress
Emily Watson  (b. 1967), actress
The Right Reverend Alison White (b. 1956), bishop
Elizabeth Wiskemann (1899–1971), journalist & historian
Professor Helen Wodehouse (1880–1964), philosopher & academic
Frances Wood  (1883–1919), chemist & statistician

Notable former staff
Edith Aitken, teacher
Hertha Ayrton, engineer, mathematician, physicist and inventor
Alice Cooper, teacher
Ella Mary Edghill, translator
Ethel Gavin head 1900-1908
Harriet Morant Jones was the founding head
Jane Ellen Harrison, classical scholar
Winifred Holtby, journalist and novelist
Katharine Jex-Blake, classical scholar
Margaret Meyer, mathematician
Marie Shedlock, story teller
Katharine Wallas, politician
Emily Ward, pioneer of childcare education

References

External links 
School Website
Profile on the ISC website
Profile on the GDST website
Profile at MyDaughter

Educational institutions established in 1873
Private schools in the London Borough of Ealing
Private girls' schools in London
Schools of the Girls' Day School Trust
Member schools of the Girls' Schools Association
Member schools of the Headmasters' and Headmistresses' Conference
1873 establishments in England